"Sit with the Guru" was a song recorded and released by Strawberry Alarm Clock in 1968. It was included on the band's second album, Wake Up...It's Tomorrow. "Sit with the Guru" went to No. 65 on the US, Hot 100.

The band re-recorded a much longer version of this song for their 2012 studio album Wake Up Where You Are, including more significant sitar.

Chart performance

References 

Psychedelic songs
Strawberry Alarm Clock songs
Uni Records singles
1968 songs